Founded in 1991 by Duane Maxwell, Bridget K. Burke, and Gabriel Wilensky Gryphon Software Corporation was a leading software publisher specializing in a broad range of innovative, graphics-oriented software. The company had two product lines. One focused on graphics for video professionals, graphic designers and hobbyists; the other focused on children's software with a strong graphic orientation. The company was consistently singled out as one of the most innovative graphics software companies in the personal computer industry. Its software was used by millions of people.

Gryphon's rapid success was due to the introduction of its premier software program, Morph. The first software program to affordably bring cost-prohibitive Hollywood special effects to the personal computer, Morph enabled users to smoothly transform still images and videos into another. The ability to create this level of professional-quality special effects immediately captured the public's attention. Video professionals used Morph in a variety of ads, television commercials, music videos and film productions such as Francis Ford Coppola's Bram Stoker's Dracula, Robin Hood: Men in Tights and Dragon: The Bruce Lee Story.  Time magazine used the software to illustrate one article and to make two front covers. 

Morph, for Macintosh and Windows-based computers, also made significant inroads in less obvious forums. Architects used Morph to dramatize "before and after" stages of a historic building's restoration. Anthropologists incorporated the use of Morph in primate studies. The National Center for Missing & Exploited Children used Morph in their age progression work.

Another product Gryphon developed for the enthusiast and professional videographers was Gryphon Dynamic Effects, which was a collection of special effects plug-ins for Adobe Premiere.

Gryphon Software was recognized for the development of this technological innovation, receiving a number of awards, both in the personal computer industry and in the consumer market.

In 1994, Gryphon entered the children's software market with the introduction of the first computer-based multimedia activity centers and the Colorforms Computer Fun Set line of software for children. The Aladdin Activity Center and Lion King Activity Center applications launched Disney's successful activity center line and offered children a variety of puzzles, coloring and spelling games based on these popular animated films. Following on these successes, Gryphon developed and published The Adventures of Batman & Robin Activity Center, Power Rangers Activity Center and Superman Activity Center.

Gryphon also developed and published Gryphon Bricks, a virtual construction toy for kids. With over 300 brick styles, a palette of 12 colors and several backgrounds to choose from, both kids and adults were able to use Gryphon Bricks to create anything they could imagine. Gryphon Bricks included both kids and adults interfaces. The latter offered more sophisticated functions, allowing the software to grow with the user’s skill and expanding interests.

In mid-1997, Gryphon Software was acquired by CUC International (later renamed Cendant Software) and its products were sold under the brands Knowledge Adventure and Sierra Home.

Awards included 
Discover 1993 Technological Innovation Finalist
Software Publishers Association - 1993 Excellence In Software Codie Awards
Best Business Application
Best Graphics Application
Byte 1993 Award of Distinction
New Media Magazine New Media Envision 1993 Multimedia Award
MacUser 1993 Eddy Award Finalist Commendation
Compute! finalist, 1994

References

External links
 Official Website (archived)
 Book: CD-Morph

2D animation software
Software companies based in California
Defunct computer companies based in California
Defunct software companies of the United States
Companies based in San Diego
Software companies established in 1991
Software companies disestablished in 1999
1991 establishments in California
1999 disestablishments in California